Scarfman is a clone of Pac-Man written by Philip A. Oliver for the TRS-80 computer and published by The Cornsoft Group in 1981. A version for the TRS-80 Color Computer followed in 1982 as Color Scarfman, which uses 64x64 low resolution graphics.

Oliver also wrote the Enhanced BASIC Compiler for the TRS-80 Model III and 4.

Gameplay
The game presents a maze filled with dots and five symmetrically placed power capsules, and the player-controlled Scarfman tries to eat the dots without being eaten by one of the monsters that randomly roams the maze. Unlike Pac-Man, there are five monsters instead of four. Eating a power pill causes monsters to lower their eyes, indicating that they're vulnerable. The eyes shift to the normal position when the pill's effect wears off. In Color Scarfman, eating a power pill causes the ghosts to remain vulnerable—indicated by turning blue—until eaten or the level ends.

Reception
Dan Ekblaw reviewed Scarfman in The Space Gamer number 54. Ekblaw commented that "Overall, I would say that Scarfman'''s defects outweigh its good points by far.  I've found that this game loses its novelty after a few weeks and will spend the rest of its days sitting on a shelf".

In a 2012 retrospective, Gamasutra wrote that the "chirp-chirp-chirp chomping sound effect is maddening. But it does play like Pac-Man, more or less".

References

External links
Review in Creative ComputingReview in Personal Computer World''

1981 video games
Dragon 32 games
Pac-Man clones
TRS-80 games
TRS-80 Color Computer games
Video games about food and drink
Video games developed in the United States